Katrin Werner (born 25 May 1973) is a German politician who represents The Left. She served as a member of the Bundestag from the state of Rhineland-Palatinate from 2009 to 2021.

Life 
Born in Berlin, Werner became a member of the Bundestag after the 2009 German federal election. She is a member of the Committee for Family, Senior Citizens, Women and Youth.

References

External links 

  
 Bundestag biography 

1973 births
Living people
Members of the Bundestag for Rhineland-Palatinate
Female members of the Bundestag
21st-century German women politicians
Members of the Bundestag 2017–2021
Members of the Bundestag 2013–2017
Members of the Bundestag 2009–2013
Members of the Bundestag for The Left